Rishton Se Badi Pratha (English: Customs, More Important Than Relationships) is an Indian television series that premiered on Colors on 15 November 2010. It narrates the story of two lovers, Abhay and Surbhi, living in western Uttar Pradesh. They incur the wrath of their respective families when they elope with each other. Their family members decide to teach them a lesson by the barbaric practice of honour killing. However, when Abhay reveals that Surbhi is expecting his child, his family spares the couple's lives in the hope of a son being born to her. Surrounded by hostile relatives, Abhay and Surbhi have to cross many hurdles in order to safeguard themselves and their child. This series failed to gain the expected popularity and therefore ended earlier than was intended. Moreover, it was also under the scanner of the Information and Broadcast Ministry of the Government of India for telecasting violent beating scenes, especially those involving the female protagonist.

Cast
 Gaurav Chaudhary / Vishal Karwal as Abhay Markanday Suryavanshi
 Shalini Chandran / Parul Chauhan as  Surbhi Abhay Suryavanshi
 Nimai Bali as Markanday Suryavanshi
 Seema Pandey as Pushpa Markanday Suryavanshi
 Hindustani Bhau as Ranvijay Singh
 Srinidhi Shetty as Nidhi
 Ridheema Tiwari as Ratna Ranvijay Singh
 Kunal Karan Kapoor as Amrik Singh
 Kanika Kohli as Seema Tribhuvan Suryavanshi
 Zeb Khan as Tribhuvan Markanday Suryavanshi
 Mamta Luthra as Maayi, mother of Markanday Suryavanshi 
 Tulika Upadhyay as Kajal Vishnu Suryavanshi
 Rishina Kandhari as Pratima Amar Singh
 Mahhi Vij as Nakusha
 Dipika Kakar as Simar 
 Avika Gor as Roli
 Sargun Mehta as Phulwa

External links
Rishton Se Badi Pratha Official Site

Colors TV original programming
2010 Indian television series debuts
Indian drama television series
2011 Indian television series endings